The Dzików gas field in Poland was discovered in 1962. It began production in 1965 and produces natural gas. The total proven reserves of the Dzików gas field are around 70 billion cubic feet (2×109m³).

References

Energy in Poland
Natural gas fields in Poland